Poggio Berni (E Pôz or E Puz in Romagnolo dialect) is a frazione and former commune of the Province of Rimini, in Emilia-Romagna, Italy.

Wine and oil are its leading products – with the DOC "Colli di Rimini" wines and an olive. Poggio Berni is home to the Palio dei Somari, a donkey race. Main sights include the remains of a castle held by the Malatesta family, and the Palazzo Marcosanti, a former fortress in the countryside, turned today into a tourist resort.

On January 1, 2014, Poggio Berni merged with Torriana, forming a new municipality called Poggio Torriana

References

Former municipalities of Emilia-Romagna
Frazioni of the Province of Rimini
Cities and towns in Emilia-Romagna
Castles in Italy